The Southwestern Brewery and Ice Company is a historic brewery in Albuquerque, New Mexico, located adjacent to the BNSF railroad tracks in East Downtown. Built in 1899, it is one of the only surviving 19th-century commercial buildings in the downtown area.

History
The Southwestern Brewery was founded in 1888 by Don and Harry Rankin, and later taken over by Jacob and Henry Loebs. By the start of the 20th century it was one of Albuquerque's largest employers and its flagship product, Glorieta Beer, was distributed throughout the southwest. The statewide enactment of Prohibition in 1917 forced the company out of the brewing business, but its ice-making operations remained profitable. The facility changed hands several times starting in 1948, but continued to produce ice for most of the 20th century. It finally closed in 1997.

The brewery was added to the New Mexico State Register of Cultural Properties in 1975 and the National Register of Historic Places in 1978. In 1998, the former cold storage and mechanical building on the south side of the complex was destroyed by a fire that also slightly damaged the main brewery building.

See also
List of breweries in New Mexico
 List of defunct breweries in the United States

References

Beer brewing companies based in New Mexico
Defunct brewery companies of the United States
Buildings and structures in Albuquerque, New Mexico
Brewery buildings in the United States
Ice companies
Industrial buildings completed in 1899
Industrial buildings and structures on the National Register of Historic Places in New Mexico
National Register of Historic Places in Albuquerque, New Mexico
New Mexico State Register of Cultural Properties
Defunct manufacturing companies based in New Mexico
Economy of Albuquerque, New Mexico
History of Albuquerque, New Mexico
Unused buildings in New Mexico
American companies established in 1888
Food and drink companies established in 1888
American companies disestablished in 1997
1888 establishments in New Mexico Territory
1990s disestablishments in New Mexico